SGGS may refer to:

Sri Guru Granth Sahib
St. George's Girls' School
Shri Guru Gobind Singhji Institute of Engineering and Technology
Stratford Girls' Grammar School